Ampelosaurus (meaning "vine lizard") is a titanosaurian sauropod dinosaur from the Late Cretaceous Period of what is now France. Its type species is A. atacis, named by Le Loeuff in 1995. A possible unnamed species has given Ampelosaurus an age reaching to the latest Cretaceous, from about 70 to 66 million years ago.

Like most sauropods, it would have had a long neck and tail but it also carried armor in the form of osteoderms. Over 500 bones have been assigned to Ampelosaurus and all but the braincase (assigned to A. sp.) has been assigned to A. atacis. They are assigned to the same species because all the differences in the limb proportions have been linked to individual variation. A. atacis is known from a few, well-preserved teeth and some cranial material. A right scapula was discovered associated with a coracoid. The blade of the scapula, contrary to most titanosaurs, is triangular. The blade narrows at one end instead of showing an expansion like most other genera. Aside from that, it is known from a partial forelimb, and many femora.

Titanosaurians were a flourishing group of sauropod dinosaurs during Cretaceous times. The Spanish locality from the latest Cretaceous of “Lo Hueco” yielded a relatively well preserved, titanosaurian braincase, which shares a number of unique features with A. atacis from France. However, it appeared to differ from A. atacis in some traits also. The specimen has been provisionally identified as Ampelosaurus sp.; it is most likely a mature titanosaurian since the bones of the braincase have largely fused together.

Ampelosaurus lived alongside many other animals. Over 8500 specimens have been found alongside it, including gastropods, bivalves, crocodiles, other sauropods, plants and invertebrates in the Villalba de la Sierra, Gres de Saint-Chinian, Marnes Rouges Inférieures and Gres de Labarre formations. Recent attention has made Ampelosaurus one of the most well-known dinosaurs known from France.

Discovery and naming

Ampelosaurus was originally found near the commune of Campagne-sur-Aude in the Aude département of France. It was recovered in the lower levels of the Marnes Rouges Inférieures Formation, which belong to the early Maastrichtian epoch of the Late Cretaceous Period, ~ 70 million years ago. These sediments represent an ancient floodplain with numerous river channels. French paleontologist Jean Le Loeuff first described and named this dinosaur in 1995. Ampelosaurus is derived from the Greek αμπελος, "the vine" and the Latinised Greek saurus, "reptile". Therefore, Ampelosaurus means "vineyard lizard" after the Blanquette de Limoux vineyard. The vineyard is located on the south side of the region Ampelosaurus was found in. The specific name is based on the Latin atax, the "Aude river".

The first remains were found in a bonebed discovered in 1989, which produced numerous ribs and vertebrae from the back and tail, as well as many limb bones, but no skull material aside from one tooth. Four osteoderms of different sizes and shapes were also recovered from this bonebed. This material comes from several different individuals. Since 1989, more material has been uncovered in the same region of France, including a relatively complete skeleton with some elements of the skull and lower jaw.

Later, in 2001, the Campagne-sur-Aude site was explored again, this time by Gerard Chauvet, Jean-Luc Le Douarec, Colette Rives and Yvonne Vidoux. After 13 years of searching, they had uncovered a mostly complete skeleton that contained much more material, including bones unknown from the holotype. The material all went to the Musee des Dinosaures, and together took about 10 years to assemble.

The A. sp. was discovered in 2007. It was found in the course of the construction of a high-speed rail track connecting Madrid with Valencia, in a fossil site that many animals were found in, in the Villalba de la Sierra Formation. The site was at a locality named “Lo Hueco,” near the village of Fuentes, Castile-La Mancha, Spain. Over the course of several months, a large-scale emergency excavation by over 60 paleontologists and 100 manual workers allowed thousands of specimens of plants, invertebrates, and vertebrates of late Campanian-early Maastrichtian age to be saved, including A. sp.

Ampelosaurus sp.

A fossil braincase from Lo Hueco was tentatively assigned to an unnamed species of Ampelosaurus, A. sp., in a 2013 article in the journal PLoS ONE. The braincase was found to share many features with A. atacis, such as a back of the skull that is flat. Parts of the bottom half of the braincase are missing. Even though section are missing, the specimen does not appear to have been deformed much, as the left and right halves are not very different.

Two frontals are preserved. The upper surface of each frontal is not smooth. One crest runs along the each frontal, and the together the two crests make up the orbital roof. Both parietals have also been found. The connection between them is marked by a ω-shaped crest. Viewed from the side, the parietal has two extensions. These extensions are not fully preserved, but they would have been on the border of the upper temporal fenestrae in their middle. The basioccipital of the specimen from Lo Hueco is unique as it has an occipital condyle that is much wider than tall. The occipital condyle has an irregular surface that was probably caused by the loss of the original cartilaginous covering. The complete braincase was especially low in the skull, and was oriented to the side. The braincase floor is made by the parabasisphenoid. The prootic is a tall but not long bone. The basisphenoid is mostly on the side of it, along with the laterosphenoid, the parietal, and the otoccipital.

Description

Like most sauropods, Ampelosaurus would have had a long neck and tail, but it also carried armor in the form of osteoderms 25 to 28 cm long. The four osteoderms found have three different morphologies, they are plate, bulb, and spine-shaped. Ampelosaurus atacis is known from many unattached bones and teeth. It is one of the best-known dinosaurs from France. It is considered to be a dwarf sauropod by Coria et al. (2005) because it has a smaller size in comparison with its ancestors.

Skeleton
 
Ampelosaurus is one of the most completely known titanosaurian sauropods from Europe. Since 1989, over 500 bones discovered at the Upper Cretaceous Bellevue locality of southern France have been assigned to A. atacis. An abundant amount of well-preserved elements have been uncovered at Bellevue. In the original description, only a tooth and some vertebrae were examined. In 2005, a complete description was made by Le Loueff of all known material, allowing Ampelosaurus to be much better understood. All the material has been assigned to the species, and even though there are some differences in limb proportions, it has all been linked to individual variation.

A. atacis is known from a few, well-preserved teeth and some cranial material, a tooth of which was described in its original description. The teeth differentiate Ampelosaurus from Magyarosaurus and Lirainosaurus, both of which are also from Europe. The teeth are different from the two later genera as Ampelosaurus has teeth that are roughly cylindrical in the top with thin expansions at the bottom. Those expansions give its teeth a slight constriction between the root and the crown. The teeth are also quite different from the peg-like teeth of titanosaurids. The teeth, have a general morphology similar to titanosaurians Antarctosaurus and a braincase from Dongargaon. Another skull was described from southern France, but showed some differences, meaning there could have been at least two different titanosaurians in France during the Late Cretaceous.

The scapula was found attached to a coracoid. The blade of the scapula, contrary to titanosaurs, is triangular, larger closer to the base. The blade narrows distally instead of showing an expansion. Differing from Magyarosaurus and Saltasaurus, the scapula does not have the dorsal crest at the base of the scapular blade. The shape of the coracoid is quadrangular, and the coracoid has a thickened cranial margin.

It has a strong distal expansion, that is similar to a titanosaur from Brazil, and a large foramen. Contrary to the South American titanosaurs, the ilium does not have an expansion on the side. The ischium, known from a shaft, is unexpanded distally and very well developed. It is also very flat. An incomplete radius is also known. It lacks the proximal and distal ends, and possesses a very prominent ridge along it. The largest and best-preserved specimens are both ulnas. The right ulna is small and slender, is missing an olecranon, and has a well-marked ridge. The ulna has a deep radial fossa.

About 27 femora are known from Bellevue, making them the most common bone, most of them more-or-less complete. They are very flat craniocaudally but otherwise, lack any unusual features. That means, that the ancestors Ampelosaurus were slightly smaller than itself. 18 humeri are also known, but none of them approach the size of the largest femur. The humeri do not have a free medullary cavity.

Three different types of osteoderms have been recovered at Bellevue. Two with large spines have been uncovered. The internal faces are all concavo-convex and have a ridge opposite the spine. In side view, they have two sections, a low half that progressively thickens, and a spine.

Vertebrae
The holotype specimen of A. atacis is a group of three connected dorsal vertebrae. Cervical vertebrae are uncommon from Bellevue and most of them are poorly preserved. The vertebrae are opisthocoelous, with centra that lengthen toward the rear. Neural spines have been preserved on the vertebrae, and they face toward the rear. Two dorsal vertebrae were preserved with a complete, but very crushed neural arch, a neural spine with a characteristic shape: it is very widened distally and narrows downwards. The vertebrae also have an internal structure that is spongy, with very large cells. The caudal vertebrae are all strongly procoelous and are compressed on the sides. The neural spines of the caudal vertebrae are very narrow and very tall and point toward the rear. The middle caudal vertebrae are more compressed on the sides that the others. Also, the centrum of middle caudal vertebrae is longer proportionally. Two sacral vertebrae were known from Bellevue. They are poorly preserved, and are thought to belong to a juvenile. A complete sacrum was also found in 2002.

Distinguishing anatomical features
 
This set of characters was identified by Le Loeuff in his description of Ampelosaurus to distinguish it from all other genera: teeth that weakly spatulate; a laterally widening distal extremity of neural spines on the dorsal vertebrae; neural arch of the dorsal vertebrae inclining strongly towards the rear; the lack of a distal expansion on the scapular blade; the presence of a light, ventral crest on top of the scapula; the presence of plate, bulb, and spine shaped osteoderms; and, in 2005, Le Loeuff added that the constriction of the neural spine on the dorsal and cervical vertebrae was also probably a characteristic of Ampelosaurus.

Neuroanatomy

Compared with Giraffititan, the inner ear of A. sp. shows a more basal morphology. That feature is possibly related to a restricted range of possible movements that involve head-turning.

Like in Jainosaurus and most other non-avian archosaurs, the hindbrain and midbrain of A. sp. is relatively poorly preserved in the endocast. In contrast with TMM 40435 and a few other taxa such as cf. Cetiosaurus oxoniensis and Giraffatitan, no characteristic "nub" of the cerebellum can be seen. As in TMM 40435 and many other archosaurs, the back of the brain is especially narrow in A. sp.

The cerebral region of the brain is separated from the rest of the brain by a distinct compression caused in the endocranial cavity. The rearmost part of the cerebral region of the braincase has a top with a small expansion. This is different from Jainosaurus. However, relatively much larger expansions are known in the diplodocoid sauropods Dicraeosaurus and Diplodocus. In MCCM-HUE-8741, the small opening in the skull roof middle is responsible for a swelling on the endocast that is suggestive of a pineal system. It is in the exact position where the pineal gland is expected to have been, between the forebrain and the midbrain.

The semicircular canals are contracted, and they are highly curved. The semicircular system of MCCM-HUE-8741 shows also a basal morphology, because the semicircular canals do not attach to each other.

Classification
Characteristics of the tail vertebrae and the presence of osteoderms indicate that Ampelosaurus belongs to Lithostrotia, a group of derived titanosaurians which also includes Alamosaurus and Saltasaurus. Many other paleontologists have classified Ampelosaurus as belonging to Titanosauria, Saltasauridae, and Titanosauridae. Ampelosaurus may have an uncertain classification, but it is clearly a titanosaur, with many features found in titanosaurs.

More recently, Ampelosaurus has been put in a clade with other French and Spanish titanosaurs from the late Campanian to Maastrichtian, which was named Lirainosaurinae by Díez Díaz et al. in 2018. Ampelosaurus nested as sister taxon to Atsinganosaurus also from France, and the entire clade was placed in between the taxa commonly classified as Saltasauridae and taxa normally in either Aeolosaurini or Lognkosauria.

Paleobiology

Growth
Ampelosaurus seems to have grown in a way similar to more basal sauropods. After a certain point in its development, the microscopic material of the bone became very different from more basal Sauropoda. Ampelosaurus grew more slowly once the bone microstructure became unique among sauropods. Although Diplodocoidea and basal Macronaria also show an increase in bone growth and a decrease in growth rate around the presumed onset of sexual maturity, it is much more gradual than Ampelosaurus. The process of growing, which in other sauropods started around sexual maturity, was clearly delayed in Ampelosaurus. The period of growth after sexual maturity seems to be shortened in Ampelosaurus and is dominated by slow bone building instead of fast growth. Growth marks are generally rare in sauropods or appearing only late in ontogeny, if at all. The lack of growth marks is suggestive of fast and continuous growth in sauropods, which supports the hypothesis that they achieved large body size through because of fast growth. Ampelosaurus does not show growth marks on any bone sample. This is unusual to be found with the apparently reduced growth rate and high level of bone growth seen in it, as those features are often associated with the occurrence of growth marks.

Histology

EFS, a system found on the surface of bones, is thought to show a growth plateau which indicates that maximum body size and skeletal maturity is reached in an individual. Ampelosaurus has not been known to have EFS, found on most non-titanosaurian sauropods. Magyarosaurus, a closely related titanosaur, Lirainosaurus, a titanosaur related to saltasaurids, Alamosaurus, a saltasaurid, and Phuwiangosaurus, a very basal titanosaur, were also found to have lacked EFS. However, the basal macronarian Europasaurus has been shown to have had EFS, so it was likely just titanosaurians that did not have them. The outer edge of the bones, were EFS would have been found, was well-preserved, and still lacked any fossilized proof of them being present for Ampelosaurus. However, in the PLoS ONE study that found the lack of EFS, the larger specimens were not tested, so Ampelosaurus might have had EFS. This is characteristic of titanosaurs, as diplodocoids and basal macronarians seem to have EFS. A majority of all Ampelosaurus specimens have been found with secondary osteons placed densely in the inner regions of bones, and lightly in outer regions. The osteon orientation found in Ampelosaurus of osteons not only facing across the bone is not typical of Neosauropoda. Also, there is no medullary cavity in any bones of Ampelosaurus. Ampelosaurus seems to have had many ontogenetic stages in its life based on its bone histology.

Paleoecology

Ampelosaurus atacis is known from a specimen from the Marnes Rouges Inférieures Formation. More specifically, it is known from the Bellevue layer, which has produced many vertebrate fossils. Even though it produced many vertebrates, the formation only has a few elements of plants and invertebrates. The vertebrates consist of numerous remains of Ampelosaurus, scales of Lepisosteus, shell fragments of an indeterminate turtle, cranial fragments and teeth of a crocodile, isolated theropod teeth, classified as Dromaeosauridae indet., an indeterminate ankylosaur, and a dentary and many postcranial elements of Rhabdodon priscus. The bird Gargantuavis philoinos, and dinosaur eggs have also been recovered.

Another formation A. atacis is known from is Gres de Saint-Chinian. Along with Ampelosaurus, Rhabdodon priscus, Rhabdodon septimanicus, dinosaur eggs, a Nodosauridae indet. (previously known as Rhodanosaurus lugdunensis), "Megalosaurus" pannoniensis, Variraptor mechinorum, an Avialae indet., an Enantiornithes indet., and a possible Abelisauridae indet. are known from this formation.

A. atacis is one of few vertebrates known from the Gres de Labarre Formation. The only other fossils from the formation belong to Rhabdodon priscus and a Nodosauridae indet.

Villalba de la Sierra Formation

The A. sp. is from the latest Cretaceous aged Lo Hueco region in the Villalba de la Sierra Formation. A study shows that the area around Lo Hueco dates to the late Campanian and early Maastrichtian, although a more recent study revised the later date to the latest Maastrichtian. The study showed that Lo Hueco was near the coast of the Tethys Sea, a large seaway through southern Europe and northern Africa. The area directly on the coast was shown to be a brackish-freshwater aquatic environment, with a muddy flood-plain beside it. Lo Hueco was found to be inside the flood-plain. The flood plain was found to have distributary channels of sand and terrigenous material.

About 8500 different marcoremains have been found in Lo Hueco. Sauropods make up the largest amount of the remains with many articulated individuals, caudal vertebrae and teeth. The caudal vertebrae have been identified as being from a titanosaur closely related to Lirainsaurus, but with some differences. The teeth, were assigned to Ampelosaurus atacis. Apart from sauropods, the Villalba de la Sierra Formation has a good representation of carbonized plants, mostly known from branches and leaves, and invertebrates, mostly bivalves and gastropods. Fishes from the formation include lepisosteid, which have plenty of material, and unidentified actinopterygians and teleosteans. Turtle fossils are very common, even more common than fishes. Of all this material, only two different groups have been identified, the bothremydids Polysternon and Rosasia, along with an uncommon undetermined Pancryptodiran. Squamate lizards are known only from a few undetermined specimens, and eusuchian crocodiles are known from a specimen with similarities to Allodaposuchus and Musturzabalsuchus. Ornithischias and theropod dinosaurs are not as common as sauropods but still consist of much material. Basal euornithopods and probable ankylosaurians are known from Lo Hueco. The ankylosaurian remains consist of a few vertebrae. Rhabdodon sp. is known from the formation, and is known from a fair amount of elements. Only two theropods have been identified, both Dromaeosauridae indet., one dromaeosaurine and one velociraptorine.

Biogeography
 
Titanosaurians were a flourishing group of sauropod dinosaurs during Cretaceous times. Fossils of titanosaurians have been found on all continents and their remains are abundant in a number of Late Cretaceous sites. Nonetheless, the cranial anatomy of titanosaurians is still very poorly known. Ampelosaurus is now the best known sauropod from Europe. Others include Magyarosaurus from Hungary and an unnamed species from Catalonia, Spain. Numerous other fragments and isolated bones may or may not belong to any of these forms. While most titanosaurs are found in the southern continents of Gondwana, several derived species are known from Maastrichtian sediments in the Northern Hemisphere, including Alamosaurus in North America and Opisthocoelicaudia in Asia, indicating that there must have been at least intermittent connections between the northern and southern continents. This seems to be corroborated by the European find of Tarascosaurus, a Late Cretaceous theropod dinosaur similar to the abelisaurids, otherwise known only from the southern continents.

Ampelosaurus sp. is a distinct sauropod as it is known from just a braincase. Although the number of sauropod braincases from the Late Cretaceous European archipelago found to date is limited, it shows a significant diversity. The specimen from Lo Hueco resembles the braincase of A. atacis MDE C3–761.

References

Titanosaurs
Maastrichtian life
Late Cretaceous dinosaurs of Europe
Cretaceous France
Cretaceous Spain
Fossils of France
Fossils of Spain
Fossil taxa described in 1995